Luciano D'Alessandro González (born January 24, 1977, in Anzoátegui,Venezuela) is a Venezuelan/Colombian actor and model known for his work in various telenovelas.

Biography
Luciano D'Alessandro was born on January 24, 1977, in the Venezuelan State of Anzoátegui. At the age of 16, he graduated high school from the Dr José Rafael Revenga high school and proceeded to Maracay city to study Systems Engineering. But he later found his true passion in acting and moved to Caracas where he started attending castings for television shows and commercials. He studied theater and music with Professor Natalia Martínez, thereby giving him the opportunity to join RCTV's acting academy. His fast acting role was in the Venevisión telenovela Muñeca de trapo.

His first starring role as a protagonist came in 2005 in the RCTV telenovela Amor a Palos.

Luciano has also participated in stage plays such as Hércules, Hollywood Style and Estás Ahí.  

In 2014, Luciano became a Colombian citizen. In 2022, Luciano married a Venezuelan news correspondent in Cartagena, Colombia and currently resides in Bogota, Colombia and Miami, USA.

Filmography

References

External links

1977 births
Living people
Venezuelan male telenovela actors
21st-century Venezuelan male actors
Venezuelan male models